My Kidnapper, My Love is a 1980 American TV film from EMI Television.

References

External links
My Kidnapper My Love at IMDb
Article on film at the Wrap
''My Kidnapper My Love' at BFI
My Kidnapper My Love at TCMDB

1980 television films
1980 films
American television films